Jason Frierson (born 1970) is an American lawyer and politician from Nevada who has served as the United States attorney for the District of Nevada since 2022. He was a member of the Nevada Assembly from 2011 to 2014 and again from 2016 to 2022 and serving as speaker 2017 to 2022.

Early life and education 

Frierson was born in 1970 in Los Angeles, California. He earned a Bachelor of Science from the University of Nevada, Reno in 1996 and a Juris Doctor from the William S. Boyd School of Law of the University of Nevada, Las Vegas in 2001.

Career

Frierson, a Democrat, was a member of the Nevada Assembly from February 7, 2011 to 2014, when he was defeated by John Moore by 40 votes.

He returned to the Assembly in the 2016 election, defeating Republican Norm Ross, and incumbent Republican-turned-Libertarian incumbent John Moore with 56% of the votes. He has been speaker of the assembly since 2017, and is a member of the National Black Caucus of State Legislators.

Elections

In 2010, Democratic assemblywoman Barbara Buckley retired from the Assembly because she was term limited and left the District 26 seat open. Frierson won the three-way June 8, 2010, Democratic primary with 586 votes (48.83%), and won the three-way November 2, 2010, general election with 3,853 votes (58.31%) against Republican nominee Joe Egan and Independent American candidate Stacey Gonzales.

In 2012, Frierson won the June 12 Democratic primary with 761 votes (67.58%), and won the November 6 general election with 11,550 votes (61.00%) against Republican nominee Arthur Martinez.

In 2014, Frierson was defeated by John Moore by 40 votes. He won 49.76% of the votes, while Moore won 50.24%.

In 2016, Frierson won back the 8th District seat with 56% of the vote.

U.S. attorney for the District of Nevada  

On November 12, 2021, President Joe Biden announced his intent to nominate Frierson to serve as the United States attorney for the District of Nevada. On November 15, 2021, his nomination was sent to the United States Senate.

On January 13, 2022, his nomination was reported out of the Senate Judiciary Committee. On April 27, 2022, his nomination was confirmed in the Senate by voice vote. He was sworn into office on May 11, 2022.

References

External links

Official page at the Nevada Legislature
Campaign site
 

|-

1970 births
Living people
21st-century African-American politicians
21st-century American politicians
African-American state legislators in Nevada
Democratic Party members of the Nevada Assembly
People from Los Angeles
People from the Las Vegas Valley
Speakers of the Nevada Assembly
United States Attorneys for the District of Nevada
University of Nevada, Reno alumni
William S. Boyd School of Law alumni